Emma Wong Mar (September 7, 1926 – September 16, 2015) was a California-based political activist and socialist, best known for her organizing efforts and campaigns for political office with the Peace and Freedom Party.

Early life
Born on September 7, 1926 in New York City's Chinatown, Emma Wong was the fifth of seven daughters born to Chinese immigrant parents. Her father owned a hat-cleaning shop, and her mother was an at-home seamstress. Together, they struggled to support their large family during the Great Depression. Emma attended Julia Richman High School, followed by Hunter College. After graduating, "she spent several years working as a medical technologist at Sutter Hospital in Sacramento, California and at Planned Parenthood in Oakland. She married  Henry Y. Mar, in 1952 and had two children, JoAnn and Craig."

Activism
Emma Wong Mar was highly interested in politics and current affairs. An early opponent of the Vietnam War, she could be seen carrying picket signs at countless protest demonstrations in Sacramento in the early 60s. She later joined the Peace and Freedom Party and was highly active as an organizer, opening her Oakland home for meetings and overnight guests. She was elected State Chair of the party in 1982, and ran as its vice-presidential candidate in 1984 with feminist activist Sonia Johnson as the presidential candidate.  Wong Mar was the Peace & Freedom Party's vice-presidential nominee in that year, and was the first Asian-American to run in a national general election for President or Vice-President.

She ran for State Assembly three times between 1982 and 1992 and for U.S. Congress once, in 1994. She served as co-chair of the Alameda County Peace and Freedom Party for many years. Wong Mar continued her anti-war and pro-labor activism well into the late 90s and mid-2000s. In 2001, she was honored with a "Union Heroine" award by the Hotel Employees and Restaurant Employees Union fighting on behalf of low-wage workers in Berkeley.

She struggled with asthma and then with emphysema in her late 80s, and died on September 16, 2015 after a sudden illness.

References

1926 births
2015 deaths
Activists from New York City
American political activists
American socialists
American women of Chinese descent in politics
California politicians of Chinese descent
Candidates in the 1984 United States presidential election
Candidates in the 1994 United States elections
Female candidates for Vice President of the United States
Hunter College alumni
Peace and Freedom Party vice presidential nominees
20th-century American women
21st-century American women